Chalcomela splendens is a beetle in the Chrysomelidae family, found in South Australia.

It was first described by William Sharp MacLeay in 1827 as Notoclea splendens, and was assigned to the genus, Chalcomela in 2006 by Chris Reid, giving the species name Chalcomela splendens.

References

External links 
Atlas of Living Australia: Chalcomela splendens occurrence data

Chrysomelinae
Beetles described in 1827